The Madoz was a French automobile manufactured only in 1921.  A light cyclecar powered by a 175 cc two-stroke engine and sometimes known as the "Propulcycle", it was a product of Nanterre.

References
 David Burgess Wise, The New Illustrated Encyclopedia of Automobiles

Cyclecars
Cars introduced in 1921
Defunct motor vehicle manufacturers of France